MS Chi-Cheemaun is a Canadian passenger and vehicle ferry in Ontario, Canada, which traverses Lake Huron between Tobermory on the Bruce Peninsula and South Baymouth on Manitoulin Island. The ferry service runs seasonally from mid-May to mid-October. As of 2022 she is the third largest passenger vessel sailing the Great Lakes after the  expedition cruise liner Viking Octantis and the US ferry SS Badger, although several larger vessels previously serving the Great Lakes are still in service in other parts of the world.

Literally translated, "chi-cheemaun" (in folk orthography or chi-jiimaan in the more standard Fiero double vowel spelling) means "big canoe" in Ojibwe.

History
A trip aboard Chi-Cheemaun is a long standing Great Lakes tradition dating back to the 1930s when a small, wooden vessel, Kagawong, first ferried vehicles across the Georgian Bay between Tobermory and South Baymouth. It features a drive-on, drive-off bow and stern loading and unloading through a visored bow system and a square door stern section.

Chi-Cheemaun was initially powered by two Ruston  diesel engines and an  bow thruster engine for improved handling of the vessel at slow speeds. During the 2006–2007 winter layover period, her Ruston engines were replaced with four Caterpillar V8 diesels. The addition of two mezzanine decks in 1982 increased the ship's vehicle carrying capacity.

Like her predecessors on Lake Huron, Chi-Cheemaun is owned by Owen Sound Transportation Company Limited, an agency of the Ontario Ministry of Transportation (MTO)

Chi-Cheemaun makes the  trip in about one hour and 45 minutes, three times each day during peak season and twice a day (with an extra trip Fridays) during May/June and September/October.

From 1989 to 1992, her sister ship, MS Nindawayma, ran the same route, but was retired because of service problems leading to public dissatisfaction and sat rusting in Owen Sound, Ontario.  It was finally broken up in 2012 at Purvis Marine in Sault Ste. Marie, Ontario.

Information radio
Two low power radio stations, CHEI-FM (89.9 FM in South Baymouth) and CHEE-FM (89.9 FM in Tobermory) broadcast tourist notices and schedule information for travellers on the ferry.

See also
 , a ferry on Lake Ontario
 , a  ferry on Lake Michigan

References

Further reading

External links

 Owen Sound Transportation Co. official website

1974 ships
Ro-ro ships
Ferries of the Owen Sound Transportation Company
Great Lakes ships
Transport in Bruce County
Transport in Manitoulin District
Ships built in Collingwood, Ontario